Sven Kwiatkowski (born 14 April 1977) is a German gymnast. He competed in the team final at the 2004 Summer Olympics.

References

External links
 

1977 births
Living people
German male artistic gymnasts
Olympic gymnasts of Germany
Gymnasts at the 2004 Summer Olympics
Sportspeople from Freiberg